The Chieftains 8 is an album by The Chieftains. Originally recorded for Claddagh Records and released in 1978, it was re-released on Columbia Records. It is the last of the group's albums recorded before members Seán Potts and Michael Tubridy left the band. The band performed "If I Had Maggie In The Wood" on Saturday Night Live in March 1979.

Track listing
 "The Session"
 "Doctor John Hart"
 "Seán Sa Cheo"
 "An tSean Bhean Bhocht/The Fairies' Hornpipe"
 "Sea Image"
 "If I Had Maggie In The Wood"
 "An Speic Seoigheach"
 "The Dogs Among The Bushes"
 "Miss Hamilton"
 "The Job Of Journeywork"
 "The Wind that Shakes the Barley/The Reel With The Beryle"

Personnel
 Paddy Moloney – Uilleann pipes, tin whistle
 Seán Potts – tin whistle
 Seán Keane – fiddle
 Martin Fay – fiddle, bones
 Michael Tubridy – flute, concertina, tin whistle
 Derek Bell – neo Irish harp, medieval harps, tiompán
 Kevin Conneff – bodhrán

References

The Chieftains albums
1978 albums
Columbia Records albums